Looperskapelle is a hamlet in the Dutch province of Zeeland. It is a part of the municipality of Schouwen-Duiveland, and lies about 23 km southwest of Hellevoetsluis.

Looperskapelle is not a statistical entity, and the postal authorities have placed it under Scharendijke. Looperskappele used to be home to 156 people in 1840. Nowadays, it consists of a handful of houses. It used to have a church, but it was demolished in 1590.

Looperskapelle was a separate municipality until 1813, when it was merged with Duivendijke.

References

Schouwen-Duiveland
History of Schouwen-Duiveland
Populated places in Zeeland
Former municipalities of Zeeland